Sven H. Bauer served as the International Commissioner of the Svenska Scoutrådet, the Swedish national Scouting federation.

In 1978, Bauer was awarded the 125th Bronze Wolf, the only distinction of the World Organization of the Scout Movement, awarded by the World Scout Committee for exceptional services to world Scouting.

References

External links

Recipients of the Bronze Wolf Award
Year of birth missing
Scouting and Guiding in Sweden
Year of death missing